The 1939 Gent–Wevelgem was the sixth edition of the Gent–Wevelgem cycle race and was held on 24 May 1939. The race started in Ghent and finished in Wevelgem. The race was won by André Declerck.

General classification

References

Gent–Wevelgem
1939 in road cycling
1939 in Belgian sport
May 1939 sports events